Proctoporus bolivianus, the Bolivian lightbulb lizard , is a species of lizard in the family Gymnophthalmidae. It is found in Bolivia and Peru.

References

Proctoporus
Reptiles described in 1910
Taxa named by Franz Werner